South Tawton is a village, parish and former manor  on the north edge of Dartmoor, Devon, England. An electoral ward bearing the same name exists. At the 2011 census the population was 1,683.

Historic estates
Located in the parish of South Tawton are various historic estates including:

North Wyke

North Wyke was long a possession of the Wykes family. Worthy (1896) suggested this family, Latinized to  de Wigornia ("from Worcester"), was descended from a certain William de Wigornia, a younger sons of Robert de Beaumont, Count of Meulan (c. 1142-1204) and de jure Earl of Worcester, by his marriage with Maud FitzRoy, daughter of Reginald de Dunstanville, 1st Earl of Cornwall. 
The manor of South Tawton was anciently a possession of the  Beaumont family. The effigy of John Wykes (1520-1591) of North Wyke, known locally as "Old Warrior Wykes", survives in South Tawton Church, showing a recumbent figure dressed in full armour, under a low tester with three low Ionic columns.  He married Mary Giffard, a daughter of Sir Roger Giffard (d. 1547) of Brightley, Chittlehampton, Devon.

South Zeal

The manor house of the Burgoyne family of South Zeal survives as the Oxenham Arms Public House, on the main street of the village of South Zeal, which is within the parish of South Tawton. A mural monument to Robert Burgoyne, dated 1651, survives in St Andrew's Church, South Tawton.

Climate
Since 1990, the highest recorded temperature was 27 °C (81 °F) in June 2017 and the lowest was -6 °C (21 °F) in March 2018.

Further reading
 
 
 
Wykes-Finch, Rev. W., "The Ancient Family of Wyke of North Wyke, Co. Devon", published in Transactions of the Devonshire Association for the Advancement of Science, Literature, and Art, 1903, Vol. 35, pp. 360–425 SEE HERE

References

External links

 South Zeal & its Dartmoor Environment
 Listing in Villages of the UK website

Dartmoor
Villages in Devon